Colonel the Right Reverend Monsignor Francis Oswin Cave MC (27 August 1897 – 21 November 1974) known to his friends as "Katie" was an Army officer and later a priest, who took an interest in the birds of Africa, taking part in the Hall Macdonald expedition into South West Africa in 1949. The subspecies Francolinus clappertoni cavei is named after him.

Cave was born in Hampshire in the Roman Catholic family of Captain Charles John Philip Cave and Wilhelmina Mary Henrietta Kerr. His education was interrupted by the First World War during which he joined the Royal Flying Corps and was awarded the MC. After the war, he moved to the army and joined the Rifle Brigade and served in the Sudan and east Africa. During the Second World War he served again in Africa and Asia before serving as Chief of Police in Sudan. He retired in 1949 and joined the Church to serve again in Sudan as part of the Verona Fathers' Mission. He left the country in 1955 when he published his major work The Birds of the Sudan along with J.D. Macdonald. His early interest in birds had been supported by Hugh Whistler who supported his study the birds of the Karakoram region. During the African expedition of the Natural History Museum he supported the team with his Land Rover (named "Katie") which he later donated to the Harold Hall Expedition into Australia.

References 

1897 births
1974 deaths
English ornithologists
Recipients of the Military Cross